Reginald Denny may refer to:
 Reginald Denny (actor)
 Reginald Oliver Denny, truck driver beaten during the 1992 Los Angeles riots